The Dimension Data Pro-Am is an annual golf tournament on the Southern African Sunshine Tour, founded in 1996. The tournament was co-sanctioned by the European Tour for the first two years. In 2020 it was co-sanctioned with the Challenge Tour and had increased prize money of US$340,000 (R 6,300,000). Since 2011 the winner has received an entry into the WGC Invitational.

Until 2009 it was played at the Gary Player Country Club in Sun City, South Africa, with a prize fund in 2009 of R1.8 million. The Lost City course was used during the early rounds. Since 2010 the tournament has been played at Fancourt in George in the Western Cape. It uses the Montagu and Outeniqua courses as well as The Links for the first three rounds, with the final round played on the Montagu course.

Winners

Notes

External links
Coverage on the Sunshine Tour's official site
Coverage on the Challenge Tour's official site
Coverage on the European Tour's official site

Sunshine Tour events
Former European Tour events
Golf tournaments in South Africa
Sport in the Western Cape